This was the first edition of the tournament.

James Cerretani and Leander Paes won the title after defeating Treat Huey and Denis Kudla 6–4, 7–5 in the final.

Seeds

Draw

References
 Main Draw

Oracle Challenger Series – Newport Beach
Oracle Challenger Series - Newport Beach - Men's Doubles